Elseya orestiad is a species of Australasian snapping turtle that is endemic to New Guinea. The specific epithet orestiad refers to the oreads (mountain nymphs) of Greek mythology, alluding to both the type locality and the predatory behaviour of snapping turtles.

Distribution
The species occurs in Western New Guinea. The type locality is the Cyclops Mountains.

References

 
orestiad
Turtles of New Guinea
Reptiles of Western New Guinea
Reptiles described in 2019